The term senior football may refer to the following:

 Gaelic football played at senior national level, such as the All-Ireland Senior Football Championship
 Gaelic football played at senior local level, such as the Donegal Senior Football Championship

See also
 Junior football (disambiguation)